Rotvoll is a neighbourhood in the city of Trondheim in Trøndelag county, Norway.  It is located in the borough of Charlottenlund. It is located next to the Trondheim fjord between Leangen to the west and Grillstad to the east.

The area is known for its rich bird life and has several times been proposed for protection. When a Statoil research and development facility was built there in the 1991, it resulted in civil disobedience at the climax of the Rotvoll controversy.

The area has some suburban housing and is otherwise dominated by the Statoil research facility and Sør-Trøndelag University College campus for teacher training and Norwegian Sign Language interpreters. Rotvoll is served by city buses and by Rotvoll Station on Trønderbanen, the commuter train in Trøndelag.  There are also several conjoint Anthroposophical projects:

Camphill Rotvoll (Camphill Rotvoll - Kristoffertunet) is an intentional community, consisting of 3 family houses; a mixed community with 25 people, some of whom with special needs. Camphill Rotvoll run several workshops: Rotvoll Safteri - a juice and jam facility, Rotvoll landhandel - a general store with mostly bio- dynamic foodstuffs and Rotvoll farm as well as a bakery, weavery and a small market-garden.

 Rotvoll Waldorf School (Steinerskolen på Rotvoll) is a school is based on the educational philosophy of Rudolf Steiner, the founder of anthroposophy.

See also
Camphill Movement
Waldorf education

References

External links
 Rotvoll Waldorf School, website
Camphill Rotvoll website

Geography of Trondheim
Neighbourhoods of Trondheim